Massey University's Manawatū campus is surrounded by farmland, most of it used as training farms. These are known as the Massey Farms.

Demographics

It had a population of 444 at the 2018 New Zealand census, a decrease of 252 people (-36.2%) since the 2013 census, and a decrease of 252 people (-36.2%) since the 2006 census. There were 21 households. There were 156 males and 285 females, giving a sex ratio of 0.55 males per female. The median age was 19.3 years (compared with 37.4 years nationally), with 18 people (4.1%) aged under 15 years, 363 (81.8%) aged 15 to 29, 57 (12.8%) aged 30 to 64, and 6 (1.4%) aged 65 or older.

Ethnicities were 67.6% European/Pākehā, 6.1% Māori, 4.7% Pacific peoples, 25.0% Asian, and 6.1% other ethnicities (totals add to more than 100% since people could identify with multiple ethnicities).

The proportion of people born overseas was 40.5%, compared with 27.1% nationally.

Although some people objected to giving their religion, 61.5% had no religion, 25.0% were Christian, 1.4% were Hindu, 2.0% were Muslim, 2.0% were Buddhist and 2.0% had other religions.

Of those at least 15 years old, 78 (18.3%) people had a bachelor or higher degree, and 0 (0.0%) people had no formal qualifications. The median income was $5,100, compared with $31,800 nationally. Of those aged 15 or older, 57 (13.4%) people were employed full-time, 54 (12.7%) were employed part-time, and 24 (5.6%) were unemployed.

References

Massey University
Palmerston North
Populated places on the Manawatū River